Panfilovo is a rural locality (a settlement) in Gus-Khrustalny, Vladimir Oblast, Russia. The population was 132 as of 2010. There are 2 streets.

References 

Rural localities in Gus-Khrustalny District